

Events

Television
January – Australian Music's Awards ceremony Countdown Awards rebrands the name to Countdown Music and Video Awards. As a result, Countdown returns for 1983 with a revamp, and gone were the screaming-louded studio audience, the iconic jingle and in their place – a quiet studio 
24 January – Australian soap opera from Crawford Productions, Carson's Law, premieres on Network Ten starting off as a 90-minute movie length episode with another two-hour episode in the same timeslot the following night before settling into its twice-weekly 60-minute format the following week. 
6 February - Seven Network's soap opera, Sons and Daughters, premieres on UK television,  on the ITV network. All fourteen ITV regions air the entire series at their own pace during daytime,  until 1994.
March – British children's animated series Danger Mouse airs on ABC in Victoria and some other states of Australia for the first time.
10 March – Final episode of the Australian drama series The Sullivans airs on Nine Network.
30 March – Australian drama series The Young Doctors airs it final episode on Nine Network after a record-breaking of over 1,396 episodes.
22 April – The 25th Anniversary TV Week Logie Awards, hosted by Michael Willesee airs on Network Ten.
24 April – The Eurovision Song Contest is telecast in Australia for the first time.
30 April – Four Corners program aired exposing allegations that NSW Premier Neville Wran had tried to influence the magistry over the dropping of fraud charges against Kevin Humphreys, charged with misappropriation of funds from the Balmain Leagues Club. Humphreys is forced to resign his position as President of the NSWRL, while Wran has to face the Street Royal Commission over the allegations and was later exonerated.
19 May – Australian drama series Patrol Boat returns for a brand new series on ABC.
10 June – James Dibble retires from presenting ABC News NSW after 26 years.
1 July – The Australian Broadcasting Commission changes its name to the Australian Broadcasting Corporation.
11 August – The ABC airs the final episode of the Australian drama series Patrol Boat.
26 September – After Australia's America's Cup win, Prime Minister Bob Hawke goes on the Today show and declared a national public holiday for that day, stating that "Any boss who sacks a worker for not turning up today is a bum."
14 October – Channel 0/28 commences transmission in Canberra, Goulburn and Cooma on the UHF band, and changes its name to Network 0/28.
29 October – Seven Network and various regional stations broadcast a selection of movies and TV programs in 3D in a 2-hour experiment.
20 November – Debut of American sitcom Cheers on the Nine Network.
27 November – The last ever episode of The Don Lane Show goes to air on the Nine Network. In the last episode before immigrating back to America, Don Lane celebrated his 50th Birthday Party.

Debuts
 24 January – Carson's Law (Network Ten) (1983–1984)
 2 February – Waterloo Station (Nine Network) (1983–1984)
 3 March – Come and Get It (ABC TV) (1983–1992)
 6 March – The Dismissal (Network Ten) (1983)
 18 April – Starting Out (Nine Network) (1983)
 12 July – Kings (Nine Network) (1983)
 12 September – The Willow Bend Mystery (ABC TV) (1983)
 20 September – Scales of Justice (ABC TV) (1983)
 26 September – Australia You're Standing In It (ABC TV) (1983–1984)
 4 October – All the Rivers Run (Seven Network) (1983)
 24 October – Captain Cookaburra's Australiha (ABC TV) (1983–1988)
 4 November – Five Mile Creek (Channel Seven) (1983)

New International Programming
6 January – / The Coral Island (ABC TV)
 12 January –  The Hitchhiker's Guide to the Galaxy (ABC TV)
 8 February –  Remington Steele (Nine Network)
 8 February –  Airline (ABC TV)
 11 February –  Matt Houston (Network Ten)
 18 February –  Joanie Loves Chachi (Nine Network)
 21 February –  Tales of the Gold Monkey (Channel Seven)
 21 February –  The Chinese Detective (ABC TV)
 23 February –  It Takes a Worried Man (ABC TV)
 5 March –  Pac-Man (Channel Seven)
 7 March – // Ritter's Cove (ABC TV)
 8 March –  Under the Mountain (ABC TV)
 11 March –  The Amazing Adventures of Morph (ABC TV)
 24 March –  Knight Rider (1982) (Nine Network)
 25 March –  Fame (Seven Network)
 5 April –  Holocaust (Channel Seven)
 12 April –  Metal Mickey (ABC TV)
 23 April –  Tucker's Witch (Nine Network)
 25 April –  Never the Twain (ABC TV)
 25 April –  The President's Diamonds (Network 0/28)
 26 April –  Bring 'Em Back Alive (Nine Network)
 27 April –  The Devlin Connection (Nine Network)
 4 May –  Gustavus (ABC TV)
 9 May –  Casper and the Angels (ABC TV)
 5 June –  Herbie the Love Bug (Nine Network)
 12 June –  The Barchester Chronicles (ABC TV)
 17 June –  Andy Robson (ABC TV)
 24 June –  Sea Urchins (ABC TV)
 6 July –  The Legend of King Arthur (ABC TV)
 29 July –  T.J. Hooker (Network Ten)
 31 July –  Harry's Game (Nine Network)
 8 August –  Star Blazers (ABC TV)
 8 August –  Seeing Things (ABC TV)
 22 August –  Cecilia's Family (Network 0/28)
 19 September –  Codename Icarus (ABC TV)
 1 October –  He-Man and the Masters of the Universe (1983) (Channel Seven)
 14 October –  No Soap, Radio (Nine Network)
 13 November –  Teachers Only (Channel Seven)
 14 November –  Gavilan (Channel Seven)
 15 November –  Open All Night (Nine Network)
 15 November –  World War III (Network Ten)
 16 November –  Silver Spoons (Network Ten)
 18 November – // Fraggle Rock (Network Ten)
 20 November –  Cheers (Nine Network)
 22 November –  Simon and Simon (Channel Seven)
 23 November –  The Renegades (Network Ten)
 27 November –  At Ease (Network Ten)
 28 November –  Family Ties (Channel Seven)
 1 December –  Casablanca (Network Ten)
 9 December –  Highcliffe Manor (Nine Network)
 16 December –  Secombe with Music (ABC TV)
 23 December –  Astro Boy (1980) (ABC TV)
 25 December –  The Snowman (ABC TV)
  Pandamonium (Nine Network)

Television shows

1950s
 Mr. Squiggle and Friends (1959–1999)

1960s
 Four Corners (1961–present)

1970s
 Hey Hey It's Saturday (1971–1999)
 Young Talent Time (1971–1989)
 Countdown (1974–1987)
 The Don Lane Show (1975–1983)
 Prisoner (1979–1986)

1980s
 Kingswood Country (1980–1984)
 Sale of the Century (1980–2001)
 Wheel of Fortune (1981–present)
 Sunday (1981–2008)
 Today (1982–present)

Ending this year
 10 March – The Sullivans (Nine Network, 1976–1983)
 30 March – The Young Doctors (Nine Network, 1976–1983)
 20 May – The Simon Gallaher Show (ABC TV, 1982–1983)
 11 August – Patrol Boat (ABC TV, 1979–1983)
 4 October – Scales of Justice (ABC TV, 1983)
 13 November – The Don Lane Show (Nine Network, 1975–1983)

Returning this year

TV movies

See also
 1983 in Australia
 List of Australian films of 1983

References